The following highways are numbered 233:

Canada
 Manitoba Provincial Road 233
 Newfoundland and Labrador Route 233
 Prince Edward Island Route 233
 Quebec Route 233

Costa Rica
 National Route 233

Ireland
 R233 regional road

Japan
 Japan National Route 233

United States
 Alabama State Route 233
 Arkansas Highway 233
 California State Route 233
 Colorado State Highway 233
 Georgia State Route 233
 K-233 (Kansas highway)
 Kentucky Route 233
 Maine State Route 233
 Montana Secondary Highway 233
 Nevada State Route 233
 New Mexico State Road 233
 New York State Route 233
 Ohio State Route 233
 Oregon Route 233
 Pennsylvania Route 233
 Tennessee State Route 233
 Texas State Highway 233 (former)
 Texas State Highway Spur 233
 Utah State Route 233 (former)
 Virginia State Route 233
 Wyoming Highway 233